The 1976–77 season was Galatasaray's 72nd in existence and the club's 19th consecutive season in the Turkish First Football League. This article shows statistics of the club's players in the season, and also lists all matches that the club have played in the season.

Squad statistics

Players in / out

In

Out

1. Lig

Standings

Matches

Turkiye Kupasi

1/4 final

European Cup Winners' Cup

First round

Second round

Friendly match

Pre-season friendly

Yasin Özdenak Testimonial match

Quad-tournament

Deprem Kupası

Attendance

References

 Tuncay, Bülent (2002). Galatasaray Tarihi. Yapı Kredi Yayınları 
 1979–1980 İstanbul Futbol Ligi. Türk Futbol Tarihi vol.1. page(121). (June 1992) Türkiye Futbol Federasyonu Yayınları.

External links
 Galatasaray Sports Club Official Website 
 Turkish Football Federation – Galatasaray A.Ş. 
 uefa.com – Galatasaray AŞ

Galatasaray S.K. (football) seasons
Turkish football clubs 1976–77 season
1970s in Istanbul
Galatasaray Sports Club 1976–77 season